This is a list of hospitals in Mississippi (U.S. state), sorted by hospital name.

Hospitals
The American Hospital Directory lists 122 hospitals in Mississippi.

Defunct hospitals

Note
1.Bed count included in University of Mississippi Medical Center's total bed count.

References

External links
 Mississippi Hospital Association
 Mississippi Trauma Centers

Mississippi
 
Hospitals